Asia Resource Minerals, was a mining company listed on the London Stock Exchange.

History
In July 2010 Vallar plc, a Jersey-incorporated investment vehicle founded by Nathaniel Rothschild, raised £707.2 million ($1.07 billion) in an Initial public offering on the London Stock Exchange. Together with other members of the Vallar management team, they have invested £100 million in shares of the company. Vallar decided to focus on investments in mining of metals, coal, and iron ore in the Americas, Russia, Eastern Europe, and Australia.

In November 2010, Vallar announced it was buying stakes for $3bn in two listed Indonesia thermal coal (used for power stations) producers for a combination of cash and new Vallar shares, with a view to combining them to create the largest exporter of thermal coal to China, India, and the other emerging economies of Asia. The transaction closed as planned on 8 April 2011. In April 2011, Vallar plc was renamed Bumi plc.

In September 2012 the company announced that it was looking into possible financial irregularities at its Indonesian arms resulting in a 14% fall in its share price.  Its much-delayed financial results for 2012 showed a $200m black hole. It was reported that Rosan Roeslani, a former CEO of the subsidiary, had stolen $173 million from the firm. The firm decided that if Roeslani returned the money, no legal action would be taken.

In December 2013 the company changed its name to Asia Resource Minerals; at the same time Samin Tan paid $223 million to purchase the Bakrie family's 23.8% stake in the company.

The company had an 84.7% holding in Berau Coal.

References

External links
Official site

British companies established in 2010
Sinar Mas Group